Ceallach Spellman (born 31 August 1995) is an English actor and presenter best known for playing Matthew Williams in the revival of ITV drama Cold Feet, Harry Fisher in the BBC One school-based drama Waterloo Road from 2010 to 2011 and hosting Friday Download and various other programmes on CBBC.

From July 2015 until August 2020, he presented his own show on BBC Radio 1 which aired every Sunday afternoon between 16:00 and 19:00 with his co-presenter Katie Thistleton. He played Marcus, a lead character in the 2020 Netflix drama White Lines.

Life and career
Spellman was born on 31 August 1995 and he is of Irish descent. A Roman Catholic, he attended St Bede's College, Manchester. Subsequently, he attended Sylvia Young Theatre School from the age of 11.

In May 2011, Spellman started presenting Friday Download on CBBC alongside Georgia Lock, Richard Wisker, Dani Harmer, Tyger Drew-Honey, Aidan Davis and Dionne Bromfield. From 19 July 2015, he started presenting his own show on Sunday afternoons on BBC Radio 1. In September 2016, he began starring as Matthew in the sixth series of British comedy-drama Cold Feet.

On 1 July 2016, he was rated as one of "50 Fittest Boys" by Vogue magazine.
On 11 October 2016, it was announced that Spellman would be joining The Voice UK on ITV as social media reporter and online presenter of The V Room. On 15 November 2016, it was announced he will do the same for The Voice Kids UK.

In August 2020, it was announced that Spellman would be leaving his Sunday slots on Radio 1 at the end of that month to focus on his acting and broadcasting commitments. Vick Hope replaced Spellman, co-hosting Life Hacks and The Official Chart: First Look'' on Radio 1 from the beginning of September 2020.

Filmography

Film and television

Radio

Music videos

References

External links
 

1995 births
Living people
BBC Radio 1 presenters
English male radio actors
English male television actors
English male child actors
English television presenters
English people of Irish descent
People educated at St Bede's College, Manchester
Male actors from Manchester
English Roman Catholics